The Valencianas de Juncos is the professional female volleyball team of Juncos, Puerto Rico.

History
The team was found in 2004.

Current volleyball squad
As of February 2011
 Head Coach:  Xiomara Molero
 Assistant coach:  Victor Vásquez

Release or Transfer

Palmares

League Championship 
2007

References
 League Official website
 Team website

Puerto Rican volleyball clubs
Volleyball clubs established in 2004